Pascal Mailloux (born 5 May 1957) is a Francophone Canadian pianist.

Biography

Pascal started his professional piano career in 1980, with his first band Leyden zar,
where he was a composer, keyboardist, and singer.
Pascal has been playing piano since he was a 5-year-old, and studied piano for 10 years with the Vincent d"indy school, later at the age of 17 [1975 to 1977] Pascal studied at the Sherbrooke music college, Quebec, Canada

Pascal and Marjo
Pascal worked together with Marjo on many albums, out of which Marjo sold over 1 million albums throughout his career. In 1985–90 Another album "she who goes" by Marjo and Composition of the song The one that goes "At the end of heaven", in 2003:Composition and Recording the album turquoise Marjo

Discography

1980–85:  Leyden Zar with André Perry 
1989–90:  Album Marjo As long as there are children(250,000 copies sold)
Recording of album Nanette Workman with "Luc Plamondon"
Composition of the theme song "As long as there are children"

Television, cinema, advertising and shows

    2009: Spectacle Bénéfice & Les yeux du cœur, with Laurence Jalbert, Florence k, Jonathan Painchaud, Bob Walsh & Manon d'Inverness"
    2008: Composition of Song for Marie-Chantal Toupin "It's not easy"
    2008: Spectacle Bénéfice,& Benefit Concert "The eyes of the heart" with Marjo, Nanette Workman, Boom Desjardins &  Mélanie renaud'
    2007: Music series "Mon œil Pour zone3"
    2006: Advertisements in Hyundai
    2005: Recording & Registration With Various Artists & shows throughout Quebec
 2004–06: Quebec Tour with Marjo & Tribute Show at Francofolies Montreal
    2002: Documentary, Italy-Canada
    2001: Music composer of Américan  One Way Out with James Belushi
    1999: Series "The big fears of 2000" with Simon Durivage, Motion International Production, dissemination vat
 1998-00: Séries Documentary  Ecce homo des productions Coscient
    1995: Advertising International Player's racing cars with Jacques Villeneuve advertising
    2001: Sans retour
    2005: Turquoise
  Bachelor Theme – Production Zone 3 Tqs
  Free Tour to Pixcom
  Prod Pixcom Theme music for Radio Canada "37.5"
  Love Hurts theme song & Music Theme "Bread of Love"for TV-Quebec
  Channel-life theme: Eros & Company & Hello Doctor "Canal life theme"
  Radio-Canada theme: Olive and Papaya & Attention is Hot
  Theme of the "Love"
  Theme of the Costs to the 400 TV-Quebec
  Series Love Hurts, production zone 3, T
  "The last game of life" for VAT with Claude Charron
  "Origins" documentary series Historia
  "News of God" for Tele-Quebec
  "Rona my house" vat produced by Zone 3
  kids series "Geo-chip" with Marie-Michèle Desrosiers

Tours

 Canadian tour with the group "Leyden zar"
 François guy tour Musical 
 Tour with Shawn Phillips 
 Theater tour of 1979 with a Granby
 Geneviève Tour 
 "Go Gentle" tour with Gerry Boulet
 Tour France with different artists

Awards
 Winner of the "Spirit" on CHOM-FM

References

External links
Official website
Murray head album
Jutra Awards
Marjo and His Men Vol 1
No Captain
Quebec eastern townships in the seventies

Musicians from Quebec
People from Granby, Quebec
Living people
1957 births
21st-century Canadian pianists